The Luxembourg Stock Exchange, LuxSE is based in Luxembourg City at 35A boulevard Joseph II.

The chairman of the board is Alain Kinsch  and the chief executive officer is Julie Becker.

The exchange has pre-opening sessions from 7:15am to 9:00am and normal trading sessions from 9:00am to 5:35pm from Monday to Friday included, except for holidays declared by the Exchange in advance.

History
A law establishing a stock exchange in Luxembourg was passed on 30 December 1927.[3] The company was incorporated as Société Anonyme de la Bourse de Luxembourg on 5 April 1928[3], with an initial issue of 7,000 shares, each valued at 1000 francs.[10]

In March 2014, LuxSE moved to its new headquarters – the Aurora building– erected in line with the green construction concept.

In 2015, the exchange celebrated the 10th anniversary of its Euro MTF Market.

Agreements with other exchanges 
In November 2000, LuxSE signed a cooperation agreement with Euronext. As part of the agreement, trades in Luxembourg are generated through Euronext's Universal Trading Platform (UTP) allowing existing Euronext members to activate a cross-membership status on LuxSE.

On January 13, 2020 Chongwa (Macau) Financial Assets Exchange Co., Ltd. and the Luxembourg Stock Exchange signed a memorandum of understanding on cooperation in Macau . The two parties will carry out two-way bond listing, assets and investment funds and other cooperation to promote cross-border investment and offshore Liquidity in the RMB bond market.

Exchange members 
As of August 2016, the LuxSE has 53 members of which 28 have a trading status. There are nine approved market makers.

Bonds
The Luxembourg Stock Exchange specialises primarily in the listing of international bonds, in which it ranks first in Europe with 25,831 debt securities listed as of August 2016.[2] In 1963, with the issue of Italian Autostrade bonds, it became the first exchange globally to list a Eurobond, an international bond denominated in a currency not native to the country where it was issued.[2] To this day, Luxembourg has maintained a dominant position in European bond issues with approximately 40% of all cross-border securities in Europe listed in Luxembourg.[3]

Over 70 countries list at least some of their sovereign debt in Luxembourg. Luxembourg is also a preferred debt market for supranational entities such as the European Bank for Reconstruction and Development, European Commission, European Investment Bank and World Bank.[2]

In 2007, the LuxSE was the first stock exchange in the world to list a bond labelled green, i.e. a "climate awareness bond" [4] issued by the European Investment Bank. In 2015, the Exchange listed green bonds worth $11.7 billion, followed by a $9.6 billion-worth issuance in the first seven months of 2016.

Luxembourg Green Exchange 
In September 2016, LuxSE became the first stock exchange globally to introduce a platform for green financial instruments – the Luxembourg Green Exchange (LGX). LGX gathers issuers that dedicate 100% of the raised funding to green investments. It requires green securities to adhere to strict eligibility criteria, including:

 Declaring the security green, based on the ICMA GBP or CBI taxonomy, or equivalent. During the application process the issuer has to clearly state the intended green nature of the security.
 Use of proceeds. Clear disclosure that the proceeds are exclusively used for financing or refinancing projects that are 100% green, according to the GBP or CBI eligibility taxonomy.
 Ex-ante review and ex-post reporting. Issuer's commitment to provide both independent external review  and ex-post reporting.

As of January 2017, LGX displays green securities worth over EUR 45 billion, including the world's first sovereign green bond issued by the Republic of Poland. As of January 2018, LGX accounted for 50% of the world's green bond market, which represent 1% of the global debt market.

Equities
The Luxembourg Stock Exchange's main equity index is the LuxX Index – a weighted index of nine most valuable stocks by free float market capitalisation.[9] The index was fixed at 1,000 on 4 January 1999, the first trading day after Luxembourg adopted the Euro.[9] The nine companies currently composing the listing are:

Footnotes

External links
 Luxembourg Stock Exchange website
 Fundsquare - subsidiary of the Luxembourg Stock Exchange
 e-file.lu - secure transmission platform of the Luxembourg Stock Exchange and Finesti
  Coordinated text of statutes of the Luxembourg Stock Exchange

Stock exchanges in Europe
Stock Exchange
Financial services companies of Luxembourg
Financial services companies established in 1928
1928 establishments in Luxembourg